The 2009 V8 Supercar Challenge was the eleventh event of the 2009 V8 Supercar Championship Series. It was held on the weekend of the October 22 to 25 at the Surfers Paradise Street Circuit in Queensland. After the cancellation of the A1 Grand Prix event the same weekend, the V8 Supercars became the main event on the program for the Nikon SuperGP carnival. The winner of the event was Mark Winterbottom, winning two of the weekend's four races.

Format change
The V8 Supercar Challenge consists of the 19th and 20th races of the season. After the collapse of A1 Grand Prix's involvement in the Nikon SuperGP, V8 Supercar expanded its involvement in the event. The original program planned for a 44 lap,  race to be held on each of Saturday (Race 19) and Sunday (Race 20). The expanded program saw those two races split into a total of four 34 lap,  races, consisting of Races 19a, 19b, 20a and 20b in the 2009 V8 Supercar series. Winner of Race 19 will be decided via points accumulation between races 19a and 19b, with Race 20 calculated in identical manner. Grid positions for Races 19a and 20a to be decided by separate qualifying sessions, with 19b and 20b to be decided by finishing order of the preceding races.

This format changed for the Gold Coast 600 which became a two-driver endurance with two 300 km races one on saturday and one on sunday starting in 2010.

Qualifying

Race 19
Races 19a and 19b were held on Saturday October 24.

Race 20
Races 20a and 20b were held on Sunday October 25.

Race 20a
Fabian Coulthard and Cameron McConville wrecked against the wall before the first corner. Coulthard's car was heavily damaged and would take no further part in the weekend. Steven Richards spun Greg Murphy around further back. Richards was subsequently issued a black flag for a driving infringement. Up front Lowndes out-launched the front row pair of Jason Bargwanna and Rick Kelly to jump into the race lead before the Safety car appeared to clean up the mess left by the opening lap.

Rick Kelly caught and passed Bargwanna at the restart. Bargwanna quickly lost further positions as the car misfired on seven cylinder. A quick pitstop to fix a plug lead got Bargwanna back up to pace, but well back in the pack, a cruel result after his first pole position in ten years. Will Davison dropped to the tail of the field with damage to the front right corner of the car after clipping a dislodged tyre bundle at one of the many chicanes. The car pitted and the HRT crew began to replace the damaged right side steering arm.

Michael Patrizi stopped at the top of the course, safety car sent out to control the field once more. The Safety car was sent out the lap after pitstops began, vaulting the few cars who pitted early to the top of track position. At the subsequent restart Shane van Gisbergen overtook Jamie Whincup prior to passing the start/finish line, incurring an instruction from race control to let Whincup past again. Whincup had slowed approaching to line as he prevented himself from overtaking a pitbound Will Davison.

Lowndes settled into a lead over Rick Kelly, although Kelly was later given a black flag as his Commodore was venting fuel from the back of the car. Kelly eventually pitted on lap 20. The following lap Michael Caruso had a major engine failure, dumping fluid over Seek Turn Three. Lee Holdsworth and Greg Murphy spun at the Beach Esses on lap 27.

Lowndes raced on to take a two-second lead over Winterbottom, Garth Tander, Russell Ingall and the Dick Johnson Racing pair of James Courtney leading Steven Johnson. The sting was the second to last lap retirement of Jamie Whincup, bouncing off the walls exiting Falken Tyres Turn at the top of the circuit.

Results
Results as follows:

Qualifying
Qualifying timesheets:

Race 19a
Race timesheets:

Race 19b
Race timesheets:

Qualifying
Qualifying timesheets:

Race 20a
Race timesheets:

Race 20b
Race timesheets:

Standings
 After Race 20 of 26

References

External links
Official series website
Official timing and results

V8 Supercar Challenge
Gold Coast Indy 300
Sport on the Gold Coast, Queensland
October 2009 sports events in Australia